William Osman (born June 8, 1991) is an American YouTuber and engineer based currently in Ventura County, California. His eponymous YouTube channel features invention-based builds and challenges, including testing dummy fingers in car windows, building a scrap boat for a competition, and challenging other popular YouTube personalities to an egg drop competition. Prior to YouTube, Osman used his degree in mechanical and electrical engineering to work with MRI machines, exploration vehicles, and military testing equipment. He is also the host of the Safety Third podcast.

Early life and education
Osman attended Foothill Technology High School. He created short skits with his best friend, cameraman, and assistant editor John Willner throughout high school. During his senior year, Osman made a Stirling Engine that could turn heat into mechanical energy for the 2009 California State Science Fair. Osman earned his Bachelor of Science degree from California State University, Northridge in 2014, majoring in mechanical engineering and minoring in electrical engineering.

Career
Osman created what would become his main YouTube channel on November 25, 2013. The majority of his early videos centered around testing his 80 watt laser cutter named "Retina Smelter 9000", in which different unconventional materials were examined for their ease of laser cutting.

Early in December 2017, Osman and his wife, Chelsea, lost their home in the Thomas Fire. A GoFundMe account was started by his family friend to help pay for the damages. Osman posted a YouTube video about the house fire on December 5, 2017, and it quickly went viral. The GoFundMe campaign had a goal of $10,000, but surpassed $120,000 from more than 6,300 donors in 20 hours. Osman's channel gained a lot of attention in the period immediately following the fire.

As of January 2023, Osman has posted over 160 videos and accumulated over 432 million views. His channel hit 1 million subscribers in June 2019. He has collaborated with Mark Rober, Simone Giertz, and many other maker YouTubers. In August 2019, he partnered with the U.S. Navy for part of their Sailor VS series. The Navy worked with three YouTube creators with a focus on science, technology, and math, inviting them to highlight different technical roles and equipment. Osman was invited aboard the USS Theodore Roosevelt to compete in an egg drop competition against a pair of sailors from a cybersecurity team.

On July 19, 2019, Osman created a second channel for behind the scenes footage and snippets of his life. His second channel now consists of videos with ranging topics: unboxing videos, follow-ups, and smaller quick videos. As of January 2023, it has amassed over 373,000 subscribers.

References

External links
 Official Personal Blog
 Laser Cutting Info
 William Osman at Social Blade
 William Osman 2 at Social Blade

1991 births
Living people
People from California
Engineers from California
American YouTubers
Technology YouTubers
Educational and science YouTubers
Comedy YouTubers
American mechanical engineers
American electrical engineers
People from Ventura, California
YouTube channels launched in 2008